Hyderabad was a first-class cricket team based in Hyderabad, Sindh, Pakistan. Their home ground was the Niaz Stadium. In first-class cricket they participate in the Quaid-i-Azam Trophy. For Twenty20 and List A cricket tournaments in the National T20 Cup and National One-day Championship they are known as the Hyderabad Hawks.

Playing record
Hyderabad made their first-class debut in 1958-59 and have played in most seasons since then. At the end of the 2013-14 season they had played 177 matches, with 24 wins, 90 losses and 63 draws. They have usually been one of the weaker Pakistan teams. They reached the quarter-finals of the Quaid-i-Azam Trophy in 1968-69, the quarter-finals of the BCCP Trophy in 1971-72, and the final of the Quaid-i-Azam Trophy Silver League in 2005-06.

Their highest individual score is 208, by Bashir Shana against Public Works Department in 1973-74. Their best bowling figures are 7 for 50 by Maqsood Hussain against Hyderabad Education Board in 1964-65. Hussain took 13 for 91 in the same match, Hyderabad's best match figures.

Other teams
In 1969-70 Hyderabad fielded two teams, Hyderabad Whites and Hyderabad Blues. Each side played two matches in the Quaid-e-Azam Trophy. Hyderabad Whites lost both their matches, and Hyderabad Blues lost one and drew one.

See also
 List of Hyderabad cricketers (Pakistan)

References

External links
 Hyderabad at CricketArchive

Hyderabad District, Pakistan
Pakistani first-class cricket teams